Dennis Taylor (born 1949) is a retired snooker player.

Dennis Taylor may also refer to:
 Dennis Taylor (racing driver) (1921–1962), British racing driver
 Dennis Taylor (musician) (1953–2010), Nashville-based saxophonist
 Dennis Taylor (footballer) (born 1990), Jamaican footballer
 Dennis E. Taylor, Canadian novelist and computer programmer